The Wapta Icefield is located on the Continental Divide in the Waputik Mountains of the Canadian Rockies, in the provinces of British Columbia and Alberta. The icefield is shared by Banff and Yoho National Parks and numerous outlet glaciers extend from the icefield, including the Vulture, Bow and Peyto Glaciers. Runoff from the icefields and outlet glaciers supply water to both the Kicking Horse and Bow Rivers, as well as numerous streams and lakes.

The icefield is one of the most studied in the Canadian Rockies and all evidence supports the conclusion that the icefield is shrinking in area, especially near the lowest altitudes of its outlet glaciers, including Peyto Glacier, in which the glacier has become both shorter in length and thinner in thickness.

The icefield is easily accessible by mountaineers in both the summer and winter.  Both ski trips in the winter and glacier hiking trips in the summer often combine a traverse of this icefield with a trip across the Waputik Icefield directly to the south.

Glaciers

These are the glaciers that are part of this icefield:
Peyto Glacier
Bow Glacier
Yoho Glacier
Vulture Glacier
The Crowfoot Glacier which was once connected to this icefield is no longer part of the Wapta Icefields.

Huts
There are five huts which provide accommodation to mountaineers on the Wapta Icefield that are operated by the Alpine Club of Canada.
Bow Hut
Peter and Catharine Whyte Hut (Peyto Hut)
Balfour Hut
Louise and Richard Guy Hut
Scott Duncan Hut

See also
List of glaciers in Canada

References
 
 

Banff National Park
Ice fields of Alberta
Ice fields of British Columbia
Great Divide of North America
Yoho National Park